Pa Godar or Pagodar or Pa-ye Godar or Pagdar may refer to:
 Pagodar, Anbarabad, Kerman Province
 Pagodar, Faryab, Kerman Province
 Pagodar, Jiroft, Kerman Province
 Pagodar-e Amjaz, Kerman Province
 Pa Godar, Razavi Khorasan
 Pagodar-e Badvar